Warren Swasey Henderson (November 14, 1927 – October 22, 2011) was an American politician in the state of Florida.

Henderson served in the Florida State Senate from 1963 to 1965, 1967 to 1971, and 1973 to 1984, representing the 22nd, 32nd, and 25th districts. Henderson was born in Exeter, New Hampshire. He attended Denison University and the University of Florida College of Law. He was a numismatist and also worked in the investments industry. He died in 2011.

Warren Swasey Henderson was the father of Warren Charles Henderson.  It was the younger Warren Henderson who held elective office in New Hampshire.

References

2011 deaths
1927 births
Florida state senators
Chairpersons of the New Hampshire Republican State Committee